Xhunashi Caballero (born 1 November 1989) is a Mexican karateka. She won a silver medal at the 2011 Pan American Games and she repeated this at the 2015 Pan American Games. In 2019, she won one of the bronze medals in the women's kumite -61 kg event at the Pan American Games held in Lima, Peru.

In June 2021, she competed at the World Olympic Qualification Tournament held in Paris, France hoping to qualify for the 2020 Summer Olympics in Tokyo, Japan. She was eliminated in her first match by Lynn Snel of the Netherlands. In November 2021, she competed in the women's 61 kg event at the World Karate Championships held in Dubai, United Arab Emirates.

Achievements

References 

Living people
1989 births
Place of birth missing (living people)
Mexican female karateka
Pan American Games medalists in karate
Pan American Games silver medalists for Mexico
Pan American Games bronze medalists for Mexico
Karateka at the 2011 Pan American Games
Karateka at the 2015 Pan American Games
Karateka at the 2019 Pan American Games
Medalists at the 2011 Pan American Games
Medalists at the 2015 Pan American Games
Medalists at the 2019 Pan American Games
21st-century Mexican women